Dolichancistrus atratoensis is a species of catfish in the family Loricariidae. It is native to South America, where it occurs in the Atrato River basin in Colombia. The species reaches 8.2 cm (3.2 inches) SL and reportedly inhabits high-altitude environments.

References 

Ancistrini
Catfish of South America